The Schneider Row Houses are the row houses built between 1889 and 1892 on the north and south sides of the 1700 block of Q Street NW in Washington, D.C.

They were built by architect Thomas Franklin Schneider (1859-1938), who designed about 2,000 buildings in the area, including the Cairo Apartment Building one block to the east. Schneider paid $175,000 for the land on the north side of the street and developed the entire block at once.

The houses are part of the Dupont Circle Historic District as listed on the National Register of Historic Places.

References

Dupont Circle
Houses on the National Register of Historic Places in Washington, D.C.
Houses completed in 1892
Historic district contributing properties in Washington, D.C.
1892 establishments in Washington, D.C.